Erygia antecedens is a moth of the family Erebidae. It is found on Peninsular Malaysia, Sumatra and Borneo. The habitat consists of lowland (dipterocarp) forests.

References

Moths described in 1858
Erygia
Moths of Asia